A number of ships have been named Galatea, after the Galatea of mythology.

Naval ships

Italian Navy  
 , a  launched in 1933 and struck in 1948

Royal Danish Navy  
  was a corvette launched in 1831 and decommissioned in 1861
  was an  launched in 1916 and sold for scrapping in 1946
 , a survey ship launched as HMS Leith in 1933, was acquired by Denmark from mercantile service and renamed in 1949; she was sold for scrapping in 1955.

Royal Navy  
  was a 20-gun sixth-rate post-ship launched in 1776 and broken up in 1783.
  was a 32-gun fifth rate launched in 1794 and broken up 1809.
  was a 36-gun fifth rate launched in 1810, a coal hulk after 1836, and broken up 1849.
  was a wooden screw frigate launched in 1859 and broken up 1883. In 1866 she went on a world cruise, under the command of Prince Alfred, Duke of Edinburgh. 
  was an Orlando-class cruiser which was launched in 1887 and sold for scrapping in 1905.
  was an Arethusa-class light cruiser launched in 1914 and sold 1921.  
  was a light cruiser of (another) Arethusa class, launched in 1934, and torpedoed and sunk in the Mediterranean in 1941. 
  was a RNVR stone frigate in Kingston upon Hull that was decommissioned in 1958.
  was a Leander-class frigate built in 1963 and expended as a target in 1988.

Spanish Navy 
  served from 1922 to 1981; she was previously a barque-rigged cargo ship built in 1896, and is now the museum ship Glenlee, berthed in Glasgow.

United States Navy  
 was a steamship originally built for merchant service but purchased by the navy before completion and converted into a gunboat for service in the American Civil War.  
 was a private yacht built in 1914 and purchased by the navy for use as an armed patrol boat during World War I.

Other  
  was a 1,400-ton American passenger-cargo coastal steamship. 
 Galatea (yacht), built in 1885, was the 1886 America's Cup challenger.
  is a lighthouse tender of the United Kingdom launched in 2006.

References

External links
 

 
 

Ship names